Ghada Shouaa (born September 10, 1972) is a retired Syrian heptathlete. At the 1996 Summer Olympics, she won her country's first and only Olympic gold medal. She was also a World and Asian heptathlon champion. She is considered one of the best Asian and Arab female athletes of all time. She was a Syrian flag bearer at the opening ceremony of the 1996 Atlanta Olympics.

She has represented Syria in her two strongest multi-event disciplines, the individual high jump and long jump events. She holds the Syrian high jump records with 1.87 m outdoors (1996), in javelin with 54.82 m (1999) in 200 m with 23.78 (1996), in long jump with 6.77 (1996) and in shot put with 16.25 (1999).

Shuaa's heptathlon results include finishing 25th at the 1992 Barcelona Olympics, 24th at the 1991 World Championships, third at the 1999 World Athletics Championships and first at the 1994 Asian Games. She is also multiple gold medalist at the Arab Athletics Championships. With a performance of 6942 points at the Hypo-Meeting, which moved her into the world all-time Top 25 and she went down in history as the best Asian and Arab heptathlete.

Shouaa's career coincided with those of older compatriot, three-time Olympic champion and four-time World champion legend Jackie Joyner-Kersee and Olympic champion Denise Lewis.

Early life
She was born in the small Syrian city of Mhardeh in the Hama Governorate. Growing up in rural Syria, Ghada Shouaa first realised her sporting potential at the age of 12 when she managed to catch a rabbit that had escaped from the hands of an old man in her village. She was soon harnessing her natural speed, competing in cross-country races. However, it was in basketball that she made her initial foray into the world of elite sport. She played for the Syrian national team for a few years, but then decided to compete in athletics.

Career
In 1991, Shouaa took part in a competitive heptathlon in Aleppo for the first time and set a new Syrian national record with a points tally of 4,010. She was immediately sent to the 1991 World Championships in Tokyo, where she placed last. She concluded her first athletics season with a silver medal in the 1991 Asian Athletics Championships.

Shouaa debuted at the Olympics in the 1992 Barcelona Games, placing 25th in spite of an injury. Her breakthrough did not come until 1995, when she won the important heptathlon meet in Götzis, scoring 6715 points. This boosted her to one of the favourites for the title at the 1995 World Athletics Championships, held in Gothenburg. After co-favorite Sabine Braun dropped out with an injury, Shouaa won the title with a comfortable margin.

The following season, Shouaa again won the 1996 Hypo-Meeting, bringing the still-standing Asian record to 6942 points. In Atlanta, three months later, she confirmed her status as the best heptathlete at the time, winning Syria's first Olympic gold medal.

A serious injury ruined the following season, and she was unable to make a serious comeback until 1999, when she placed third at the World Championships behind Eunice Barber. Shouaa attempted to defend her Olympic title in Sydney, but she again became injured and did not even finish the first event. After this disappointment, she decided to retire from athletics. After 2001, she was declared the best Syrian athlete of the 20th century.

Civil War in Syria
During a visit to Syria in 2013 or 2014 in the midst of civil war, Shouaa appeared in a picture with a heavy machine gun while accompanying the National Defence Forces, a branch of Syrian Armed Forces.
In a speech, Shouaa greeted the Syrian Arab Army, saying the army's motto 'Homeland, Honor, Honesty' represents "each and every honest Syrian from which he/she draws the ability for steadfastness and making achievements for Syria's sake". She now lives in Germany.

Personal bests
 100 metres hurdles: 13.72 s
 Long jump: 6.77 m NR
 High jump: 1.87 m NR
 200 m: 23.78 s NR
 Shot put: 16.25 m NR
 Javelin throw: 54.82 m NR
 800 m: 2:13.59 min
 Heptathlon: 6942 AR, NR  (still currently #9 all time, 342 pts behind the world record)

Seasonal bests

Competition record

Honours
1995: Prix Monique Berlioux 
1995–1996: Women's Heptathlon Best Year Performance

See also 
List of Syrian people

References

External links 
 
 

1972 births
Living people
Olympic athletes of Syria
Syrian heptathletes
Syrian female athletes
Olympic gold medalists for Syria
Athletes (track and field) at the 1992 Summer Olympics
Athletes (track and field) at the 1996 Summer Olympics
Athletes (track and field) at the 2000 Summer Olympics
Asian Games gold medalists for Syria
Asian Games medalists in athletics (track and field)
Athletes (track and field) at the 1994 Asian Games
World Athletics Championships athletes for Syria
World Athletics Championships medalists
Medalists at the 1996 Summer Olympics
Olympic gold medalists in athletics (track and field)
Goodwill Games medalists in athletics
Syrian Christians
Medalists at the 1994 Asian Games
Mediterranean Games silver medalists for Syria
Mediterranean Games medalists in athletics
Athletes (track and field) at the 1993 Mediterranean Games
People from Hama Governorate
World Athletics Championships winners
Competitors at the 1994 Goodwill Games
20th-century Syrian women